Xingtian (also Hsing T'ien) is a Chinese deity who fights against the Supreme Divinity, not giving up even after the event of his decapitation. Losing the fight for supremacy, he was beheaded and his head buried in Changyang Mountain. Nevertheless, headless, with a shield in one hand and a battle axe in the other, he continues the fight, using his nipples as eyes and his bellybutton as a mouth.

Description
Xingtian was an official under Yandi. Yandi fought against Huangdi for the position of supreme god, but he lost the conflict. Xingtian still continued the fight after Yandi's defeat, but was defeated and decapitated by Huangdi. Eventually, he regenerated himself and continued his defiance, which was expressed by a martial dance.

Literature
Xingtian appears in chapter 7 of the Classic of Mountains and Seas, which states that he fought and lost against the supreme god to become the supreme divinity. The god decapitated Xingtian and buried his head on Changyang Mountain. However, Xingtian persevered, using his nipples as his eyes, using his navel as his mouth, and brandishing his shield and axe. The Shanhaijing states the following:

In Luo Mi's Lushi from the Southern Song period, Xingtian is described as a minister of the Yan Emperor, who composed music for farmers for plowing and harvesting.

In the Huainanzi, Xingtian is called the corpse of Xingcan (形殘之尸).

The scholar Guo Pu celebrated Xingtian's defiant spirit in an encomium. He mentions the similarity between Xingtian and the corpse of Geng of the Xia, since they were both characters who regenerated and continued their resistance.

The poet Tao Qian also celebrated Xingtian's spirit in his Thirteen Poems upon Reading the Guideways through Mountains and Seas, where he made an association between Jingwei and Xingtian in their persistence to overcome tragedies but also mentions their inability to be free from it:

Symbolism
Xingtian symbolizes the indomitable spirit which maintains the will to resist no matter what tribulations one may undergo or what troubles one may encounter. As such, Xingtian has been lauded in poetry and prose.

In popular culture 
 Smite's playable Chinese monster is Xing Tian.

See also

Headless men
Kabandha
Weapons and armor in Chinese mythology, legend, cultural symbology, and fiction

Notes

References

Bibliography
 Yang, Lihui, et al. (2005). Handbook of Chinese Mythology. New York: Oxford University Press. 
Strassberg, Richard (2002). A Chinese Bestiary: Strange Creatures from the Guideways Through Mountains and Seas. University of California Press.

Chinese gods
Chinese giants